Olesya Murtazaliyevna Aliyeva (born 17 August 1977) is a Russian former alpine skier who competed in the 1998 Winter Olympics and 2006 Winter Olympics.

External links
 sports-reference.com

1977 births
Living people
Russian female alpine skiers
Olympic alpine skiers of Russia
Alpine skiers at the 1998 Winter Olympics
Alpine skiers at the 2006 Winter Olympics
Universiade silver medalists for Russia
Universiade medalists in alpine skiing
Competitors at the 1999 Winter Universiade